The Hulda Klager Lilac Gardens are nonprofit botanical gardens specializing in lilacs, located at 115 South Pekin Road, Woodland, Washington. The gardens are open 10:00am–4:00pm daily; a $4.00 admission fee is charged, except during Lilac season when the admission fee is $5.00.

History
The gardens were established by Hulda Klager (1863–1960), who began hybridizing lilacs in 1905. By 1910 she had created 14 new varieties, and in 1920 she started showing her lilacs every spring.

In 1948 the gardens were flooded, only the larger trees survived. People who had purchased plants in the past returned starts to Hulda and the gardens were replanted. Two years later in 1950 the gardens were once again open for the annual "Lilac Week".

Hulda eventually developed over 250 varieties. After her death, the gardens were preserved and then organized into a nonprofit foundation in 1976.

Today the gardens contain more than 90 varieties of lilacs, as well as Victorian gardens and a farmhouse.

See also 
 List of botanical gardens in the United States

References

External links 
 Hulda Klager Lilac Gardens
Photo gallery

Klager Lilac Gardens
Parks in Cowlitz County, Washington
Parks on the National Register of Historic Places in Washington (state)
National Register of Historic Places in Cowlitz County, Washington